Mark Petrie (born 20 May 1979) is a New Zealand film, television and video game composer. He is best known for composing the music in trailers for Guardians of the Galaxy, Life of Pi, Mission Impossible: Ghost Protocol, Sherlock Holmes: A Game of Shadows, Avengers: Infinity War, and Venom, as well as writing the score for EA Sports' Madden NFL American football video games. He has also composed scores for films, television shows, documentaries, political campaigns and sporting events.

Early life and influences 
Petrie was born and raised in Auckland, New Zealand. He began his early musical training while boarding at Dilworth School for eight years, studying piano and composition. After winning a scholarship to study film scoring at the Berklee College of Music in Boston, Massachusetts, he relocated to the United States, and completed a degree majoring in film scoring.

Career 
After graduating from Berklee College of Music, Petrie was awarded the BMI Foundation's Pete Carpenter Film Composing Fellowship. He was flown to Los Angeles to work under the Grammy Award-winning composer Mike Post. He then began writing for TV shows and independent films. In 2007, he collaborated with PostHaste Music to compose music for trailers. He went on to compose dozens of tracks for them. He is known for "infusing contemporary elements on top of epic orchestral writing" (Output.com).

In 2012, he released his first album 'Genesis', featuring 27 tracks in the "modern, epic orchestral style showcased in his work in trailers for The Amazing Spider-Man, The Green Lantern, The Twilight Saga: Breaking Dawn – Part 2, Mission: Impossible – Ghost Protocol, and Battleship." In 2021, several of Petrie's tracks were added to the main entrance area music of Epcot.

Fan made music videos featuring Petrie's music began to surface on YouTube around 2010 and many have amassed millions of views.

Filmography / Discography

Trailers

Films

Television

Video games

Awards and nominations 
In 2004, Petrie won the Columbine Award at the Moondance International Film Festival for the 2003 film Cafe and Tobacco, shared with Michael Justiz. In the same year, he was awarded the Pete Carpenter Fellowship.

In 2018, he won the ASCAP Screen Music Award for Top Television Series for The Bachelor and The Bachelorette.

References

External links 
 Mark Petrie on YouTube
 Mark Petrie on SoundCloud
 

1979 births
Berklee College of Music alumni
Living people
Male film score composers
Male television composers
New Zealand expatriates in the United States
New Zealand film score composers
New Zealand television composers
People educated at Dilworth School
Video game composers